Willow Run is a 1st order tributary to Husbands Run in New Castle County, Delaware.

Course
Willow Run rises in Sharpley, Delaware, and then flows southwest through Woodbrook and the DuPont Country Club, where it joins Husbands Run about 0.5 miles east of Fairfax.

See also
List of Delaware rivers

References

Rivers of Delaware
Rivers of New Castle County, Delaware
Tributaries of the Christina River